The Brooks Bandits are a junior A ice hockey team in the Alberta Junior Hockey League (AJHL).  They play in Brooks, Alberta, Canada, with home games at the Centennial Regional Arena.

History
The Brooks Bandits were awarded an expansion franchise by the Alberta Junior Hockey League (AJHL) in 1999 and began play in the 2000–01 season. The franchise secured its expansion fee through what they call "The Founding Fathers", a group of 17 local businesses and individuals who donated the money needed to finance the team in exchange for lifetime benefits with the team.

The first coach for the Brooks Bandits was Nolan Crouse.  The first franchise goal was scored by Chris Boyle just under a minute into the first regular season game against the Fort McMurray Oil Barons. The team struggled though most of its first four seasons, failing to make the playoffs. In 2004, the Crowsnest Pass Timberwolves took a leave of absence for one season, and their players were dispersed, adding Judd Blackwater and Neil to the Bandits team. Under head coach Kevin Higo and players such as Brendan Connolly, Spencer Machacek, Ben Wright, and Chad Johnson, the Bandit advanced to the AJHL playoffs for the first time.

In 2008, after three successful years, Higo accepted an assistant coaching position with the Moose Jaw Warriors in the major junior Western Hockey League. With the head coach and general manager positions vacant, the Bandits hired ECHL head coach and former NHL enforcer Brian Curran. Under Curran's leadership of a hard-hitting team, the Bandits finished in first place in the South Division before losing in the cross-over division playoff finals against the Grande Prairie Storm. On October 16, 2009, Curran was released by the Bandit and replaced by assistant Ryan Papaioannou. The Bandits finished fifth in the south division in 2009–10 and a second round playoff loss. During the season on January 20, 2010, the Bandits moved from the smaller Centennial Arena in the Lakeside Leisure Centre, to the brand new Centennial Regional Arena.

In Papaioannou's second 2010–11 season, the Bandits finished second in the division, but were eliminated in the second round by the Camrose Kodiaks in seven games. In the off-season on July 5, 2011, forward Nick Crosby was killed in a car accident returning home from a Bandits camp. After Crosby's death, the Bandits dedicated the 2011–12 season in his honour and retired his #23 jersey. The Bandits had statistically their best season to date with a record of 47–7–8. In the playoffs, they swept both the Calgary Canucks and the Olds Grizzlys in four games, advancing to their first league playoff championship series against the Fort McMurray Oil Barons. The Bandits won the series four games to two for their first league championship. In the Doyle Cup, the Bandits faced the British Columbia Hockey League (BCHL) champion Penticton Vees for the right to participate in the Junior A national championship tournament, the Royal Bank Cup. The Vees defeated the Bandits four games to one and went on to win the 2012 Royal Bank Cup Jr. A national championship.

The Bandits continued to dominate the AJHL at the start of the 2012–13 season going 20–0–0 before finally losing a game. The Bandits were one win short of tying the AJHL record for longest winning streak. The Bandits were led by captain Cam Maclise, Mark Reners, and Dakota Mason. The Bandits finished the regular season with a record of 53–4–3, breaking the AJHL record for wins in season, and points in a season (109). In all but one week (week 1), the Bandits were ranked as the number one team in Canada by the Canadian Junior Hockey League. In the playoffs, the Bandits defeated the Drumheller Dragons and Okotoks Oilers before winning a second straight AJHL championship over the Spruce Grove Saints. 2013 was the first year of the Western Canada Cup qualifying tournament to advance to the national championship and was held in Nanaimo, British Columbia. The Bandits finished first in the round-robin portion of the tournament, but lost to the Surrey Eagles 4–1 in the championship game. As the Western Canada Cup qualified two teams to the Royal Bank Cup, the Bandits played the Yorkton Terriers in the runner-up game the following day and won 1–0. They went 3–1 in the round-robin at the 2013 Royal Bank Cup and won their first Junior A national championship over the Summerside Western Capitals, becoming the first team to win the championship without either being the host or a regional champion.

They returned to the Western Canada Cup again in 2016 and 2017, winning the Western Junior A regional in 2017 and was the runner-up qualifier in 2016. They lost the 2017 Junior A national championship game in overtime to the Cobourg Cougars. The Western Canada Cup discontinued after the 2017 tournament and the AJHL qualified through the Doyle Cup again beginning in 2018. The Brooks Bandits were also selected as the host city for the 2019 National Junior A Championship. The Bandits then won the AJHL championship for a fifth time in 2019, but lost the Doyle Cup to the Prince George Spruce Kings in which both teams were also already qualified to advance to the national championship. Brooks then went undefeated in the championship tournament, winning the final game over the Spruce Kings 4–3, for their second Junior A national championship title.

Brooks won the 2022 Centennial Cup in Estevan, SK by defeating the Pickering Panthers 4-1.

Season-by-season record
Note: GP = Games played, W = Wins, L = Losses, T/OTL = Ties/Overtime losses, SOL = Shootout losses, Pts = Points, GF = Goals for, GA = Goals against

Western Canada Cup
The Western Canada Cup was a postseason tournament between the playoff champions of the Alberta Junior Hockey League (AJHL), British Columbia Hockey League (BCHL), Manitoba Junior Hockey League (MJHL), Saskatchewan Junior Hockey League (SJHL), and a previously selected host team from one of the leagues. It ran from 2013 to 2017 with the top two teams qualifying for the Royal Bank Cup Junior A national championship tournament. It replaced the Doyle Cup, which had been the qualifier for the AJHL and BCHL champions, and the ANAVET Cup, which had been the qualifier for the MJHL and SJHL champions. The qualifying system reverted the Doyle and ANAVET Cups in 2018.

The tournament began with round-robin play between the five team followed by the top two teams playing in championship game and the third and fourth place teams playing in a semifinal game. The loser of the championship game then faced the winner of the semifinal game for the runner-up qualifier. The winner of the championship and the runner-up game advanced to the Royal Bank Cup.

Junior A National Championship
The National Junior A Championship, known as the Centennial Cup and formerly as the Royal Bank Cup or RBC Cup, is the postseason tournament for the Canadian national championship for Junior A hockey teams that are members of the Canadian Junior Hockey League. The tournament consists of the regional Junior A champions and a previously selected host team. Since 1990, the national championship has used a five-team tournament format when the regional qualifiers were designated as the ANAVET Cup (Western), Doyle Cup (Pacific), Dudley Hewitt Cup (Central), and Fred Page Cup (Eastern). From 2013 to 2017, the qualifiers were the Dudley Hewitt Cup (Central), Fred Page Cup (Eastern), and the Western Canada Cup champions and runners-up (Western #1 and #2).

The tournament begins with round-robin play between the five teams followed by the top four teams playing a semifinal game, with the top seed facing the fourth seed and the second facing the third. The winners of the semifinals then face each other in final game for the national championship. In some years, the losers of the semifinal games face each other for a third place game.

Notable alumni
The following alumni have gone on in their career to play in the National Hockey League or similar achievements in international hockey.
Curtis Glencross
Chad Johnson
Spencer Machacek
Cale Makar
Ty Rattie
Jeff Malott

See also
 List of ice hockey teams in Alberta

References

External links

 Brooks Bandits website
 Alberta Junior Hockey League website

Alberta Junior Hockey League teams
Brooks, Alberta
Ice hockey teams in Alberta
Ice hockey clubs established in 2000
2000 establishments in Alberta